Edwin Manners (March 6, 1855 – May 4, 1913) was an American lawyer, property owner and diarist.  He graduated from Princeton University with a Bachelor of Arts in 1877, went on to earn a degree in Law at Columbia University, and was accepted to the bar.  He became involved in projects to improve Jersey City, such as a project improving the water supply.  He continued as a lawyer, besides his municipal interests, and spent a good deal of time managing his property. He also kept a journal detailing his life over a 21-year period, from 1893 to 1913.

He is the son of the Mayor of Jersey City David Stout Manners and Deborah Philips Johnes.  The American branch, which emigrated to America about 1700, is connected with the noble family of Manners in England.

During his senior year at Princeton University he was one of the editors of the Nassau Literary Magazine.

A Manners Fund created under Manners' will continues to "provide support for advanced fellowships in the fields of English and history" at Princeton University.

Family history

Edwin Manners, A.M., LL.B., was the son of the late Hon. David Stout Manners and Deborah Philips Johnes, and was born in Jersey City, N. J., on March 6, 1855. His father was for several terms Mayor of Jersey City and universally esteemed and respected as one of its best executives and citizens. He is a grandson of David Manners, a great-grandson of John Manners, and a great-great-grandson of John Manners, Sr., of Yorkshire, England, who was born in 1678, emigrated to America about 1700, and married Rebecca Stout, of Middletown, N. J., a granddaughter of Richard and Penelope Van Princess Stout, of interesting memory, and the first in America. John Manners, Sr., settled at Upper Freehold, N. J., but afterward moved to Amwell, Hunterdon County, in this State, where he died in 1770. The American branch is connected with the noble family of Manners in England, which traces its distinguished lineage back to the time of William the Conqueror, and indeed is of Norman origin.

On his mother's side Edwin Manners was a grandson of David Johnes, a great-grandson of David Johnes, Sr., a great-great-grandson of Stephen Johnes, and a great-great-great-grandson of Samuel Johnes, Jr., who was the son of Samuel Johnes, Sr., whose father, Edward Johnes, of Somerset, England, carne to Charlestown (Boston), Mass., with (governor Winthrop in 1630); he later was one of the founders of Southampton, Long Island, and died there in 1659. Edward married Anne, daughter of George and Alice Griggs, natives of binder. The Johnes family in the United States may be distantly related to that of Dolan Cothi, in Wales, which traces to Godebog, King of Britain, but is directly descended from the Johnes family of County Berks. County Salop, and London and Somerset, England, the branches living in those counties and also in Bristol all proceeding from the same original stock. Sir Francis Johnes was Lord Mayor of London in 1620. Edwin Manners's great-grandfather, John Schenck, was a Captain in the Revolutionary War, took an active part in the principal battles in the State, and by a well-planned ambuscade prevented the British troops from overrunning Hunterdon County.

His grandfather, David -Manners, who married Captain Schenck's daughter Mary, was an officer in the War of 1812, and won honorable mention in several important engagements. On the maternal side Mr. Manners's great-great-grandfather, Stephen Johnes, married Grace Fitz Randolph, whose brother Nathaniel gave to Princeton the land upon which Nassau Hall is erected, and his great-grandfather, David Johnes, was a Major in the Revolution and rendered efficient service in establishing American independence.

Edwin Manners died in Jersey City on May 4, 1913.

University life

In the "Fifty Years of Princeton" written in 1927 about the class of '77 - Henry Fairfield Osborn had this to say about Edwin:

"Gold Badges for writers"

Included in his bequest to Princeton and Columbia Universities, Manners set up three different scholarship awards "to be used annually for the advancement of literary and historical studies".

The first award mentioned in his last will and testament is the Golden Violet, to be given to the student "who produced the best piece of literary work, whether in prose or in verse..."

The second award mentioned is one to be given to the student "who shall write the best monograph on the history of New Jersey or on some City, town or institution thereof or subject connected therewith, and the recipient of this award is to be known as the Neo Caesarean Scholar."

The last award he provides for in his will is intended for the student "who shall write the best character study or descriptive sketch, whether it be in prose or in verse.. the successful candidate is to be designated as the Winner of the Golden Tiger." Manners also prescribes that some of his bequest be used "in the making of an artistic golden violet, to be worn as a badge". To accompany the Golden Tiger award, Manners also provided for "the purchase or making of a golden tiger, in the style of an emblem and designed by an artist."

Known winners of Princeton University's Golden Tiger Award

 1917: Sam Shoemaker, Jr. 
 1918: John Peale Bishop, Richard Henry Ritter (honorable mention)
 1919: James Creese, Jr, 
 1920: no award listed
 1921: Edward Van Dyke Wight, Jr.
 1922: Ralph Edward Kent
 1923: no award listed
 1924: John Stuart Martin, Donald Alfred Stauffer
 1925: William Bradford Hubbell, Charles Edward Boynton (h.m.)
 1926: James Alan Montgomery, Jr.
 1927: no award listed
 1928: Walter Critz Watkins, James Burnham (h.m.)
 1929: Harold Allison Rue
 1930: Frank Callan Norris
 1931: John Mason Bradbury
 1932: William Main Doerflinger, Basil Beya (h.m.)
 1933: Alexander Hamilton Leighton, William Piel, Jr. (h.m.)
 1934: Robert Elwood NHail, Jr.
 1935: Philip Clark Horton
 1936: Robert Henry Super, James Avery Worden (h.m.)
 1937: Charles Edward Shain,  Alba Houghton Warren, Jr. (h.m.)
 1938: no award listed
 1939: Desideri Xavier Parreno, Burrowes Hunt (h.m.)
 1940: no award listed
 1941: George A. Hamid, Jr. 
 1942: Herbert Smith Bailey, Jr., John Nixon Brooks, Jr. (h.m.)
 1943: Joseph Deéricks Bennet, Thomas Herndon (h.m.)
 1944-47: no awards listed
 1948: Frederick Buechner, Ernest Stock (h.m.)
 1949: no award listed
 1950: Charles William Slack, John Murphy Scott (h.m.)
 1951: Robert V. Keeley 
 1952: Roy Frederick Lawrence, George Basil Lambrakis (h.m.)
 1953: John McPhee 
 1952-55: no award listed
 1956: Kurth Sprague
 1957: Carl Wilhelm Haffenreffer, Jr., Robert McConkie Rehder (h.m.)
 1958: no award listed
 1959: Charlton Reynders, Jr., Thomas Sanford James (h.m.)  
 1960: Lauren Rogers Stevens, David Vickers Forrest (h.m.)
 1961: Roy Neil Graves, II  Mark Allen Rose (h.m.)
 1962: David F. Thorburn 
 1963: George Webb Constable
 1964–present: no mention of award

Known winners of Princeton's Neo-Caesarean Scholar Award

 1921: Nolan Bailey Harmon, Jr. 
 1922-24: no award listed
 1925: K. C. Wu
 1926: Benjamin Burnis Shipman
 1927: Pinckney Alston Waring
 1928-34: no award listed
 1935: Ransom Elwood Noble, Jr.
 1936-47: no award listed
 1948: Nathan Adams and Kenneth Walbridge Condit
 1949-52: no award listed
 1953: Jack Richon Pole

Known winners of Columbia University's Golden Violet

 1931: Bascom Lamar Lunsford (awarded princeton funds in this year to record Appalachian Heritage Music)

References

External links 

People from Jersey City, New Jersey
1913 deaths
1855 births
Columbia Law School alumni
19th-century American lawyers